The 2017–18 DePaul Blue Demons men's basketball team represented DePaul University during the 2017–18 NCAA Division I men's basketball season. They were led by third-year (sixth overall with DePaul) head coach Dave Leitao and played their home games at the new Wintrust Arena in Chicago, Illinois as members of the Big East Conference. They finished the season 11–20, 4–14 in Big East play to finish in a tie for ninth place. They lost in the first round of the Big East tournament to Marquette.

Previous season
The Blue Demons finished the 2016–17 season 9–23, 2–16 in Big East play to finish in last place. They lost in the first round of the Big East tournament to Xavier. That season marked the Blue Demons' final season at Allstate Arena

Offseason

Departures

Incoming transfers

2017 recruiting class

2018 recruiting class

Preseason 
The Blue Demons were picked to finish in last place in the preseason Big East poll.

Roster

Schedule and results

|-
!colspan=9 style=| Exhibition

|-
!colspan=9 style=|Non-conference regular season

|-
!colspan=9 style=| Big East Conference regular season

|-
!colspan=9 style=| Big East tournament

References

DePaul Blue Demons men's basketball seasons
DePaul